Magic Spells is the third live album from the Brazilian progressive rock band Apocalypse released on Financiarte label. The album is part of the Apocalypse 25th Anniversary Box Set and was recorded during the Apocalypse tour.

Track listing
 Refuge (6:31)	
 Crying for Help (6:12) 	
 Mirage (4:44)	
 Magic (5:59) 	
 Cut (8:48) 	
 South America (8:37) 	
 Tears (5:49)	
 Blue Earth (8:10) 	
 Time Traveller (4:51)	
 Freedom (4:22) 	
 Peace in the Loneliness (6:29) 	
 Escape (5:41) 	
 Not Like You (3:10)

Musicians

 Eloy Fritsch: Electronic keyboards, Organ, Minimoog, vocals
 Ruy Fritsch: Electric and acoustic guitars, vocals
 Chico Fasoli: Drums, percussion, vocals
 Gustavo Demarchi: Lead Vocal
 Magoo Wise: Bass guitar

References

2010 live albums
Apocalypse (band) albums